The National Hardware Show (NHS) is held every year by RX (formerly Reed Exhibitions) in Las Vegas. It is a housing after-market show that brings together manufacturers and resellers of all products used to remodel, repair, maintain and decorate the home and garden.

The Show features over 150 product categories, providing a preview of the entire home enhancement marketplace. NHS is the most comprehensive event, education and networking platform serving the hardware and home improvement industry. As the industry spearhead, it keeps a focused eye on the cultural, environmental, and technological developments shaping the future of modern living. NHS unites and guides the industry at its live events and on its interactive channels by delivering unparalleled opportunities for fostering connections, deepening insights, and building innovative and profitable strategies for growth.

Locations
May 6–8, 2008; Las Vegas Convention Center

May 5–7, 2009; Las Vegas Convention Center

May 4–6, 2010; Las Vegas Convention Center

May 10–12, 2011; Las Vegas Convention Center

May 1-3, 2012; Las Vegas Convention Center

May 7-9, 2013; Las Vegas Convention Center

May 6-8, 2014; Las Vegas Convention Center

May 8-10, 2018; Las Vegas Convention Center

May 7-9, 2019; Las Vegas Convention Center

October 21-23, 2021; Las Vegas Convention Center

April 5-7, 2022; Las Vegas Convention Center

January 31-February 2, 2023; Las Vegas Convention Center

History
The first National Hardware Show took place in New York City in 1945 and was created by Abe Rosenburg of General Tools, along with Charlie Snitow, General's Chief Legal Council.

In the early 1960s, Reed Exhibitions (previously Cahners Expositions Group) acquired Snitow's trade show business. The Show moved to Chicago's new McCormick Lakeside exhibit hall in 1975. In February 2003, Reed Exhibitions announced that the National Hardware Show was moving to Las Vegas.

Product Introductions

Web site
http://www.nationalhardwareshow.com

Las Vegas Valley conventions and trade shows
Trade shows in the United States